Charles Richard (10 March 1900 – 31 May 1978) was a Progressive Conservative party member of the House of Commons of Canada. Born in Sainte-Anne-de-la-Pocatière, Quebec, he was a dental surgeon by career.

Richard's first attempt at a House of Commons seat was in the 1935 federal election at Kamouraska, where he was defeated by Joseph Georges Bouchard of the Liberal party.

During World War II Richard was a member of the Royal Canadian Dental Corps. At one time he also served as vice-president of Quebec's provincial dental society (Société dentaire de Québec).

He was first elected at the Kamouraska riding in the 1958 general election. He served only one federal term, the 24th Canadian Parliament, before being defeated in the 1962 election by Charles-Eugène Dionne of the Social Credit party.

References

External links
 

1900 births
1978 deaths
Canadian dentists
Members of the House of Commons of Canada from Quebec
Progressive Conservative Party of Canada MPs
Canadian military personnel of World War II
People from Bas-Saint-Laurent
20th-century dentists